Uruoca is a municipality of the Brazilian state of Ceará. Its estimated population is 13,915 inhabitants. It is part of the microregion of Coreaú, which is one of the seven microregions that make up the mesoregion of Noroeste Cearense.

The municipality contains part of the  Serra da Ibiapaba Environmental Protection Area, created in 1996.

References

Municipalities in Ceará